Shingebis in North American Indian mythology, is a diver who dared the North Wind to single combat. The Indian Boreas rated him for staying in his dominions after he had routed away the flowers, and driven off the sea-gulls and herons. Shingebis laughed at him, and the North Wind went at night and tried to blow down his hut and put out his fire. As he could not do this, he defied the diver to come forth and wrestle with him. Shingebis obeyed the summons, and sent the blusterer howling to his home.

The People of the Three Fires, the Odawa, Ojibwe and Podawadomi Indians of the Great Lakes area, had many stories about winter.  In one, Shingebis is a diving duck who dared Winter.  Shingebis decided that he would not trouble himself to fly south for the winter. He was sure he could survive just fine in his summer home. He built himself a warm lodge and got four big logs for his fire, one for each month of winter.

Fairly soon, along came Kabibonooka, the Winter Maker.  Kabibonooka was angry with Shingebis for staying in his dominions after he had routed away the flowers, and driven off the sea-gulls and herons. Shingebis laughed at him, and Kabibonooka went at night and tried to blow down his wigwam and put out his fire.  As he could not do this, he froze the lake where Shingebis hunted for food.  Shingebis found that he could pull the reeds and make a hole in the ice, dive through and get his fish. Kabibonooka raged and sent an ice storm so fierce that the lake froze too deep to break through by pulling the reeds.  Shingebiss grew very hungry, and when the storm finally subsided, he managed to use his beak to break through the ice and get some fish.  This went on for three moons. Each time it got colder, Shingebis would get another log. Kabibonooka was becoming truly outraged, and he followed Shingebis to the lake and froze him in. He was so surprised when Shingebis managed to pull reeds and peck a big enough hole to get out, dragging a string of fish.  He finally challenged Shingebis to let him into his lodge. He knew he could freeze the little duck that way.  Shingebis cheerfully put his last log on the fire, and prepared for his guest. As Kabibonooka sat there by the fire in the warm lodge, he did his best to freeze the fire, but Shingebis would stir it up and it got very warm in the lodge. Weaker and weaker from the heat, Kabibonooka finally turned and left. Soon after that Ziigwan (Spring) came.  Kabibonooka never bothered Shingebis again.  This story teaches that those who follow the ways of Shingebis will always be warm and have plenty to eat no matter how hard the winter is.

See also
Henry Wadsworth Longfellow
The Song of Hiawatha

Anishinaabe mythology